CARE Act or Care Act or may also refer to:

Ryan White CARE Act (Ryan White Comprehensive AIDS Resources Emergency Act), a 1990 U.S. law
Child Abuse Reform and Enforcement Act, a 2000 U.S. law
Patient Protection and Affordable Care Act (ObamaCare), a 2010 U.S. law
Coronavirus Aid, Relief, and Economic Security Act (CARES Act), a 2020 U.S. law
Children's Act for Responsible Employment, a U.S. bill to bring parity to child agriculture workers with other occupation workers
The UK Care Act 2014, relating to adult care, support and health matters

See also

 
 CARES Act
 Care (disambiguation)
 Act (disambiguation)